Al-Sarah is a sub-district located in Al Udayn District, Ibb Governorate, Yemen. Al-Sarah had a population of 18,808 as of 2004.

References 

Sub-districts in Al Udayn District